A Trick of Light (German: Die Gebrüder Skladanowsky) is a 1995 German film directed by Wim Wenders. The film was made with the students of the University of Television and Film Munich and is a combination of docudrama, fictional reenactment, and experimental photography to show the birth of cinema in Berlin where Max Skladanowsky and his brother Emil built a projector they called the Bioscop.

Plot

Part One 
Gertrud lived with her father Max Skladanowky and her uncles Emil and Eugen in Pankow near Berlin. Her everyday life was shaped by the inventive spirit of her father and uncles. She had a very close relationship with all of them, but especially Eugen, who worked as a clown and magician. Her father has been working long on the invention of a device that can play back moving images. So far, together with Emil, he earns his living mainly by demonstrating dissolving views or magic lanterns at fairs. Gertrud finds this form of entertainment boring and inauthentic and feels she must push them ahead with development. To Gertrud's disappointment her uncle Eugen had to go away because he took a job with the circus. She knew he would be gone for a long period of time. Gertrud doesn't want to believe that and looks in the box her father created. In doing this she accidentally exposes the first set of film strips. Luckily, the second set was kept safe. Max then solved the problem of transporting the film and can proudly present his life size projection of his brother for Gertrud. Others are also secretly interested in Skladanowsky's invention, but the family is able to repeatedly put the spy to flight.

Part Two 
On December 28th 1895, Max Skladanowsky is sitting with his brother Emil in the Grand Café on the Boulevard des Capucines in Paris and witnesses the Lumière brothers' demonstration. It is clear to him that his own apparatus is hopelessly inferior to the invention of the French. He remembers the preparations for his own demonstration: Word of the groundbreaking invention has already gotten around in Berlin, and so many artists gather to let the Skladanowskys capture them on film strips in a beer garden. The operators of the well-known vaudeville company Wintergarten on Friedrichstraße got wind of it and are trying to go to Pankow to offer the brothers a business deal. The spy, watching from a distance, tries to find out as much as possible. Emil over hears a thief offering the vaudeville owners his rival production. As he follows the man he is satisfied and relieved when he witnesses the embarrassment of the thief in his basement before the eyes of directors when his bicycle powered contraption explodes. When the brothers are posting advertisements for the Winder Garden show, the Skladanowskys discover that a famous artist is in town and performing her famous serpentine dance. They manage to get the lady to perform in front of their camera. This was supposed to add the finishing touches to their film, but during the nightly engagement between Emil and Josephine, who is the beer garden waitress he likes, the two embrace in a kiss. Emil accidentally holds a burning candle too close to the hanging film strips and one catches fire. The film that was hanging was that of the serpentine dancer, was now destroyed. Emil then decided to film Josephine performing the dance to recreate the lost film. When the final film showing takes place, neither Max nor the audience notice the mistake. Only the original performer, who is watching, begins to question what she is seeing. This is quickly forgotten when she receives the applause from the crowd. The film showing was a complete success.

Part Three 
In the present, Lucie Hürtgen-Skladanowsky, born in 1904 as the younger daughter of Max Skladanowsky, tells of her memories of her father, her uncles, her sister and the pioneering days of cinema. Suddenly Eugen and Gertrud reappear and look around the room. The scene, immersed in color, returns to black and white. When Eugen and his little niece see the well-known spy at the window, they scare him away. A modern cab is waiting for the two, but Eugen conjures up a more "contemporary" carriage in which they drive away. They then disappear at a construction site of Potsdamer Platz.

Background 
The brothers Max and Emil Skladanowsky showed their films at the Wintergarten Variété in Berlin on November 1, 1895. They were thus eight weeks earlier than the Lumière brothers, who presented their work in Paris on December 28, 1895. In contrast, the Skladanowskys' strips consisted of Variété numbers shot in front of light or dark curtains, such as a boxing kangaroo or a serpentine dance. The apparatus from Berlin called the Bioscop was ultimately inferior to the Lumières' invention because they could both record and play back with their Cinematography and were able to produce longer films.

In 1995, to mark the 100th anniversary of cinema, Wim Wenders and students from the HFF Munich made this film about the birth of the medium. In doing so, they decided against producing a documentary and in favor of a tongue-in-cheek narrative style that interpreted history rather freely, because they wanted to honor the naive and unorthodox way in which the Skladanowsky brothers approached their invention. They also wanted to emphasize their status as rather penniless hobbyists with no precision engineering training and no industrial sponsor.

The film was created as a silent film and was then provided with off screen narrators. The playing parts filmed in 1895 were shot on a historical hand crank camera from the company Askania, while the present shots were filmed with present-day cameras such as the Arri.

Parts of it had been previously shown at various film festivals. The television station "arte" showed the film in its compilation for the first time on December 28th, 1995. The film was there preceded by Wim Wenders who gave explanations on the film and its origins as well as the complete broadcast of the historical variety films that were shown at the winter garden at the time.

Cast 
 Udo Kier: Max Skladanowsky
 Otto Kuhnle: Emil Skladanowsky
 Nadine Büttner: Gertrud Skladanowsky
 Christoph Merg: Eugen Skladanowsky
 Rüdiger Vogler: Hochradfahrer
 Wim Wenders: Milchmann
 Lucie Hürtgen-Skladanowsky
 Rolf Zacher: Young Max Skladanowsky
 
 Bodo Lang
 Hans Moser
 Alfred Szczot
 Italian Peasant Dance: Children's Group Ploetz-Larella
 Funny Bar: Brüder Milton
 Boxing Kangaroo: Mister Delaware
 Juggler: Paul Petras
 Acrobat: Familie Grunato
 Kamarinskaja (Russian National Dance): Gebrüder Tscherpanoff
 Serpentine Dancer: Mademoiselle Ancion
 Apotheose: Gebrüder Skladanowsky

Lucie Hürtgen-Skladanowsky (* July 6, 1904 in Berlin; † May 15, 2001 in Berlin), the last contemporary witness of a family that made film history, has a say in the film.

Production 
A Trick of Light was jointly directed by Wim Wenders and the students of the Munich Film Academy. "Though in rigid technical terms, Wenders' film ought to be labelled a 'documentary', it reads equally well as a fiction film because there are dramatized events in the recreation of history of the lives of the three brothers who are no longer alive." There are documentary segments as well where Lucie, Max’s youngest daughter, then in her early nineties, is interviewed and answers questions quite candidly about her recollections. 

Evolving technology of cinema that sweeps through silent cinema into sound and music and dialogue within this film. It shifts from black-and-white to colour, from interior shots to location shooting. From the old jittery technique of the movie camera, the cut up film negative that is joined again to turn into a continuous flow of images but still using some of the original film. Emotional flourishes ranging from shock, suspense, disappointment, depression, fulfilment, joy, and triumph from tragedy. The production also used the black and white film within the colored interview portions with Lucie.

Release

Awards and accolades 
The film was nominated and the winner of the Friedrich-Wilhelm-Murano-Award at the "Day of the German Short Film" in 1996. The film as also shown at two international film festivals, the Berlin International Film Festival and the International Film Festival Rotterdam, both in 1997.

Critical reception and reviews 
Overall the reception of the film was positive as it combined the old film as well as new film. Its release was successful and received a lot of positive reviews on the historical and educational purposes of its making. It was technologically challenging to make but reviews had high praise in its production process and its ultimate product.

Web Links 
 Die Gebrüder Skladanowsky in the Internet Movie Database (English)
 Die Gebrüder Skladanowsky by filmportal.de
 Die Gebrüder Skladanowsky by wimwendersstiftung.de
 Ulrike Holdt: Das boxende Känguruh.

References

External links
 

1995 films
1990s German-language films
Films directed by Wim Wenders
Films set in Berlin
Films about filmmaking
German biographical films
Films set in the 1890s
German docudrama films
Films scored by Laurent Petitgand
1990s German films